The men's double York round event was part of the archery programme at the 1904 Summer Olympics. The event was held on 20 September 1904 at Francis Field. There were 16 competitors, all from the host nation of the United States. George Bryant won the gold medal (completing a double with the double American round event), with Robert Williams taking silver and William Thompson earning bronze.

Background
This was the first appearance of the event; it would be held only once more, in 1908. The 1904 Olympic archery events were part of the 26th Grand Annual Target Meeting of the National Archery Association, with competition open to international competitors though none actually competed. It was thus largely an American national championship, though the International Olympic Committee recognizes the winners as Olympic medalists. Medals were also given out for the best score at each range, though these medals are not recognized as Olympic.

Competition format
A York round consisted of 72 arrows shot at 100 yards, 48 arrows shot at 80 yards, and 24 arrows shot at 60 yards. The total number of arrows for a double round was 288. The competition was held on Tuesday, 20 September 1904. Sixteen archers competed.

The result is based on points. A total of 10 points were available. One point was awarded to the archer scoring the highest score at each distance as well as one point for the most hits on target at each distance. Two points were awarded to the archer scoring the highest total score as well as two points for the most total targets hit. Ties were broken on total score, and then on total targets hit.

Schedule
The double York round event was held on the second day of the three-day archery tournament, along with the women's double National round.

Results
Bryant had the most total hits and the highest total score, earning 4 points. He picked up 3 additional points for the best score at 60 yards (246), best score at 100 yards (281), and most hits at 100 yards (79). Williams earned both of his points at 80 yards, with the most hits (73) and best score (345). Thompson's sole point came from hitting the most targets at 60 yards (48), with 2 more hits than Bryant at that distance but scoring only 238 to Bryant's 246.

References

External links
 International Olympic Committee medal winners database
 De Wael, Herman. Herman's Full Olympians: "Archery 1904".

Men's double York round
Men's events at the 1904 Summer Olympics